The London School of Economics and Political Science (LSE) is a public research university located in London, England, and a constituent college of the federal University of London. Founded in 1895 by Fabian Society members Sidney Webb, Beatrice Webb, Graham Wallas, and George Bernard Shaw, LSE joined the University of London in 1900 and established its first degree courses under the auspices of the university in 1901. LSE began awarding its degrees in its own name in 2008, prior to which it awarded degrees of the University of London. It became a university in its own right within the University of London in 2022.

LSE is located in the London Borough of Camden and Westminster, Central London, near the boundary between Covent Garden and Holborn. The area is historically known as Clare Market. LSE has more than 11,000 students, just under seventy percent of whom come from outside the UK, and 3,300 staff. It had an income of £436.9 million in 2021/22, of which £35.5 million was from research grants. The university has the fifth-largest endowment of any university in the UK. One hundred and fifty-five nationalities are represented amongst the LSE's student body and the school has the highest percentage of international students (73%) of Anglosphere institutions in the 2021–22 Times Higher Education World University Ranking. Despite its name, the school is organised into 25 academic departments and institutes which conduct teaching and research across a range of pure and applied social sciences.

LSE is a member of the Russell Group, Association of Commonwealth Universities and the European University Association, and is typically considered part of the "golden triangle" of research universities in the south east of England. The LSE also forms part of CIVICA – The European University of Social Sciences, a network of eight European universities focused on research in the social sciences. In the 2021 Research Excellence Framework, the school had the third highest   grade point average (joint with Cambridge).

LSE alumni and faculty include 55 past or present heads of state or government and 18 Nobel laureates. As of 2017, 27% (or 13 out of 49) of all Nobel Memorial Prizes in Economics have been awarded or jointly awarded to LSE alumni, current staff, or former staff, who consequently comprise 16% (13 out of 79) of all Nobel Memorial Prize laureates. LSE alumni and faculty have also won 3 Nobel Peace Prizes and 2 Nobel Prizes in Literature. Out of all European universities, LSE has educated the most billionaires (11) according to a 2014 global census of US dollar billionaires.

History

Origins 
The London School of Economics was founded in 1895 by Beatrice and Sidney Webb, initially funded by a bequest of £20,000 from the estate of Henry Hunt Hutchinson. Hutchinson, a lawyer and member of the Fabian Society, left the money in trust, to be put "towards advancing its [The Fabian Society's] objects in any way they [the trustees] deem advisable". The five trustees were Sidney Webb, Edward Pease, Constance Hutchinson, W. S. de Mattos and William Clark.

LSE records that the proposal to establish the school was conceived during a breakfast meeting on 4 August 1894, between the Webbs, Louis Flood and George Bernard Shaw. The proposal was accepted by the trustees in February 1895 and LSE held its first classes in October of that year, in rooms at 9 John Street, Adelphi, in the City of Westminster.

20th century 
The school joined the federal University of London in 1900, and was recognised as a Faculty of Economics of the university. The University of London degrees of BSc (Econ) and DSc (Econ) were established in 1901, the first university degrees dedicated to the social sciences. Expanding rapidly over the following years, the school moved initially to the nearby 10 Adelphi Terrace, then to Clare Market and Houghton Street. The foundation stone of the Old Building, on Houghton Street, was laid by King George V in 1920; the building was opened in 1922.

The 1930s economic debate between LSE and the University of Cambridge is well known in academic circles. Rivalry between academic opinion at LSE and Cambridge goes back to the school's roots when LSE's Edwin Cannan (1861–1935), Professor of Economics, and Cambridge's Professor of Political Economy, Alfred Marshall (1842–1924), the leading economist of the day, argued about the bedrock matter of economics and whether the subject should be considered as an organic whole. (Marshall disapproved of LSE's separate listing of pure theory and its insistence on economic history.)

The dispute also concerned the question of the economist's role, and whether this should be as a detached expert or a practical adviser. Despite the traditional view that the LSE and Cambridge were fierce rivals through the 1920s and 30s, they worked together in the 1920s on the London and Cambridge Economic Service. However, the 1930s brought a return to disputes as economists at the two universities argued over how best to address the economic problems caused by the Great Depression.

The main figures in this debate were John Maynard Keynes from Cambridge and the LSE's Friedrich Hayek. The LSE economist Lionel Robbins was also heavily involved. Starting off as a disagreement over whether demand management or deflation was the better solution to the economic problems of the time, it eventually embraced much wider concepts of economics and macroeconomics. Keynes put forward the theories now known as Keynesian economics, involving the active participation of the state and public sector, while Hayek and Robbins followed the Austrian School, which emphasised free trade and opposed state involvement.

During World War II, the school decamped from London to the University of Cambridge, occupying buildings belonging to Peterhouse.

The school's arms, including its motto and beaver mascot, were adopted in February 1922, on the recommendation of a committee of twelve, including eight students, which was established to research the matter. The Latin motto, is taken from Virgil's Georgics. Its English translation is "to Know the Causes of Things" and it was suggested by Professor Edwin Cannan. The beaver mascot was selected for its associations with "foresight, constructiveness and industrious behaviour".

21st century 

LSE continues to have a wide impact within British society, through its relationships and influence in politics, business and law. The Guardian described such influence in 2005 when it stated:
Once again the political clout of the school, which seems to be closely wired into parliament, Whitehall and the Bank of England, is being felt by ministers.... The strength of LSE is that it is close to the political process: Mervyn King, was a former LSE professor. The former chairman of the House of Commons education committee, Barry Sheerman, sits on its board of governors, along with Labour peer Lord (Frank) Judd. Also on the board are Tory MPs Virginia Bottomley and Richard Shepherd, as well as Lord Saatchi and Lady Howe.

Commenting in 2001 on the rising status of the LSE, the British magazine The Economist stated that "two decades ago the LSE was still the poor relation of the University of London's other colleges. Now... it regularly follows Oxford and Cambridge in league tables of research output and teaching quality and is at least as well-known abroad as Oxbridge". According to the magazine, the school "owes its success to the single-minded, American-style exploitation of its brand name and political connections by the recent directors, particularly Mr Giddens and his predecessor, John Ashworth" and raises money from foreign students' high fees, which are attracted by academic stars such as Richard Sennett.

As of 2006, the school was active in opposing British government proposals to introduce compulsory ID cards, researching into the associated costs of the scheme, and shifting public and government opinion on the issue. The institution is also popular with politicians and MPs to launch new policy, legislation and manifesto pledges, prominently with the launch of the Liberal Democrats Manifesto Conference under Nick Clegg on 12 January 2008.

2010 to present

In the early 2010s, its academics have been at the forefront of both national and international government consultations, reviews and policy, including representation on the UK Airports Commission, Independent Police Commission, Migration Advisory Committee, UN Advisory Board on Water and Sanitation, London Finance Commission, HS2 Limited, the UK government's Infrastructure Commission and advising on Architecture and Urbanism for the London 2012 Olympics

Craig Calhoun took up the post of director in September 2012. Its previous director, Judith Rees, is also chair of the school's Grantham Institute on Climate Change, an adviser to the World Bank as well as sitting on the UN Secretary General's advisory board on water and sanitation and the International Scientific Advisory Council (ISAC). She is also a former convenor of the department of geography and environment and served as deputy director from 1998 to 2004.

In February 2016, Calhoun announced his intention to step down at the end of the academic year, in order to become president of the Berggruen Institute. In September 2016, Bank of England Deputy Governor Dame Nemat (Minouche) Shafik was announced to replace Professor Julia Black as the school's director. Shafik began to lead the LSE in September 2017.

Following the passage of the University of London Act 2018, the LSE (along with other member institutions of the University of London) announced in early 2019 that they would seek university status in their own right while remaining part of the federal university. Approval of university title was received from the Office for Students in May 2022 and updated Articles of Association formally constituting the school as a university were approved by LSE council 5 July 2022.

Controversies

In February 2011, LSE had to face the consequences of matriculating one of Muammar Gaddafi's sons while accepting a £1.5m donation to the university from his family. LSE director Howard Davies resigned over allegations about the institution's links to the Libyan regime. The LSE announced in a statement that it had accepted his resignation with "great regret" and that it had set up an external inquiry into the school's relationship with the Libyan regime and Saif al-Islam Gaddafi, to be conducted by the former lord chief justice Harry Woolf.

In 2013, the LSE was featured in a BBC Panorama documentary on North Korea, filmed inside the repressive regime by undercover journalists attached to a trip by the LSE's Grimshaw Club, a student society of the international relations department. The trip had been sanctioned by high-level North Korean officials. The trip caused international media attention as a BBC journalist was posing as a part of LSE. There was debate as to whether this put the students' lives in jeopardy in the repressive regime if a reporter had been exposed. The North Korean government made hostile threats towards the students and LSE after the publicity, which forced an apology from the BBC.

In August 2015, it was revealed that the university was paid approximately £40,000 for a "glowing report" for Camila Batmanghelidjh's charity, Kids Company. The study was used by Batmanghelidjh to prove that the charity provided good value for money and was well managed. The university did not disclose that the study was funded by the charity.

In the summer of 2017, dozens of campus cleaners contracted via Noonan Services went on weekly strikes, protesting outside key buildings and causing significant disruption during end-of-year examinations. The dispute organised by the UVW union was originally over unfair dismissals of cleaners, but had escalated into a broad demand for decent employment rights matching those of LSE's in-house employees. Owen Jones did not cross the picket line after arriving for a debate on grammar schools with Peter Hitchens. It was announced in June 2018 that some 200 outsourced workers at the LSE would be offered in-house contracts.

In 2023, the LSE formally cut ties with the LGBT charity Stonewall, a decision which was sharply criticized as transphobic by the LSE Student Union, but praised by gender critical activists as being conducive to "freedom of speech".

The World Turned Upside Down 

A sculpture by Mark Wallinger, The World Turned Upside Down, which features a globe resting on its north pole, was installed in Sheffield Street on the LSE campus on 26 March 2019. The artwork attracted controversy for showing Taiwan as a sovereign state rather than as part of China, Lhasa being denoted as a full capital, and depicting boundaries between India and China as recognised internationally. The sculpture also did not depict the State of Palestine as a separate country from Israel.

After protests and reactions from both Chinese and Taiwanese students, The university decided later that year that it would retain the original design which chromatically displayed the PRC and Taiwan as different entities consistent with the status quo, but with the addition of an asterisk beside the name of Taiwan and a corresponding placard that clarified the institution's position regarding the controversy.

Campus and estate

Since 1902, LSE has been based at Clare Market and Houghton Street in Westminster. It is surrounded by a number of important institutions including the Royal Courts of Justice, all four Inns of Courts, Royal College of Surgeons, Sir John Soane's Museum, and the West End is immediately across Kingsway from campus, which also borders the City of London and is within walking distance to Trafalgar Square and the Houses of Parliament.

In 1920, King George V laid the foundation of the Old Building. The campus now occupies an almost continuous group of around 30 buildings between Kingsway and Aldwych. Alongside teaching and academic space, the institution owns 11 student halls of residence across London, a West End theatre (the Peacock), early years centre, NHS medical centre and extensive sports ground in Berrylands, south London. LSE operates the George IV public house and the students' union operates the Three Tuns bar. The school's campus is noted for its numerous public art installations, which include Richard Wilson's Square the Block, Michael Brown's Blue Rain, Christopher Le Brun's Desert Window, and Turner Prize-winner Mark Wallinger's The World Turned Upside Down.

Since the early 2000s, the campus has undergone an extensive refurbishment project and a major fund-raising "Campaign for LSE" raised over £100 million in what was one of the largest university fund-raising exercises outside North America. This process began with the £35 million renovation of the British Library of Political and Economic Science by Foster and Partners.

The New Academic Building opened for teaching in October 2008, with an official opening by Her Majesty the Queen and the Duke of Edinburgh on 5 November 2008. In November 2009 the school purchased the adjacent Sardinia House to house three academic departments and the nearby Old White Horse public house, before acquiring the freehold of the grade-II listed Land Registry Building at 32 Lincoln's Inn Fields in October 2010, which was reopened in March 2013 by The Princess Royal as the new home for the Department of Economics, International Growth Centre and its associated economic research centres. In 2015, LSE brought its ownership of buildings on Lincoln's Inn Fields to six, with the purchase of 5 Lincoln's Inn Fields on the north side of the square, which has since been converted into faculty accommodation.

Saw Swee Hock Student Centre
The first new campus building for more than 40 years, the Saw Swee Hock Student Centre, named after the Singaporean statistician and philanthropist, opened in January 2014 following an architectural design competition managed by RIBA Competitions. The building provides accommodation for the LSE Students' Union, LSE accommodation office and LSE careers service as well as a bar, events space, gymnasium, rooftop terrace, learning café, dance studio, and media centre. Designed by architectural practice O’Donnell and Tuomey, the building achieved a BREEAM 'Outstanding' rating for environmental sustainability, won multiple awards including the RIBA National Award and London Building of the Year Award, and was shortlisted for the Stirling Prize.

Centre Building

The Centre Building, situated opposite the British Library of Political and Economic Science, opened in June 2019. Designed by Rogers Stirk Harbour and Partners following a RIBA competition, the 13-storey building includes 14 seminar rooms seating between 20 and 60, 234 study spaces, a 200-seater auditorium, as well as three lecture theatres. The building hosts the School of Public Policy, the Departments of Government and International Relations, the European Institute, and the International Inequalities Institute. It includes publicly accessible roof terraces and a renovated square at the centre of campus. The building design was recognised with RIBA's London Award and National Award in 2021.

Marshall Building
The Marshall Building, located at 44 Lincoln's Inn Fields, opened in January 2022. Designed by Grafton Architects and named after British investor Paul Marshall, the building houses the Departments of Management, Accounting, and Finance, sports facilities, and the Marshall Institute for Philanthropy and Social Entrepreneurship. The site was previously home to the Francis Crick Institute's laboratories, which LSE purchased in 2013.

Future expansion

On 15 November 2017, LSE announced that it acquired the Nuffield Building at 35 Lincoln's Inn Fields from the Royal College of Surgeons and plans to redevelop the site to host the Firoz Lalji Global Hub, the departments of Mathematics, Statistics and Methodology, the Data Science Institute, and conference and executive education facilities. The new building will be designed by David Chipperfield Architects.

Sustainability 
In 2021, LSE claimed to be the first UK university to be independently verified as carbon-neutral, which it achieved by funding rainforest trees to offset emissions through the Finnish organisation (Oy) Compensate. However, LSE omitted some of its emissions in its calculation and thus did not offset all of them. While it measured and offset emissions from heating, electricity, and faculty air travel, the school left out other travel-related emissions, as well as emissions from construction and on-campus food. LSE plans to offset the remaining emissions (scope 1 through 3) by 2050.

Organisation and administration

Governance
Although LSE is a constituent college of the federal University of London, it is in many ways comparable with free-standing, self-governing and independently funded universities, and it awards its own degrees.

LSE is incorporated under the Companies Act as a company limited by guarantee and is an exempt charity within the meaning of Schedule Two of the Charities Act 1993. The principal governance bodies of the LSE are: the LSE Council; the Court of Governors; the academic board; and the director and director's management team.

The LSE Council is responsible for strategy and its members are company directors of the school. It has specific responsibilities in relation to areas including: the monitoring of institutional performance; finance and financial sustainability; audit arrangements; estate strategy; human resource and employment policy; health and safety; "educational character and mission", and student experience. The council is supported in carrying out its role by a number of committees that report directly to it.

The Court of Governors deals with certain constitutional matters and has pre-decision discussions on key policy issues and the involvement of individual governors in the school's activities. The court has the following formal powers: the appointment of members of court, its subcommittees and of the council; election of the chair and vice chairs of the court and council and honorary fellows of the school; the amendment of the memorandum and articles of association; and the appointment of external auditors.

The academic board is LSE's principal academic body, and considers all major issues of general policy affecting the academic life of the school and its development. It is chaired by the director, with staff and student membership, and is supported by its own structure of committees. The vice chair of the academic board serves as a non-director member of the council and makes a termly report to the council.

President and Vice-Chancellor

The director is the head of LSE and its chief executive officer, responsible for executive management and leadership on academic issues. The director reports to and is accountable to the council. The director is also the accountable officer for the purposes of the Higher Education Funding Council for England Financial Memorandum. The LSE's current director is Dame Nemat Shafik, who replaced interim director, Professor Julia Black, on 1 September 2017.

The director is supported by four pro-directors with designated portfolios (education; research; planning and resources; faculty development), the school secretary, the chief operating officer, the chief finance officer, and the chief philanthropy and global engagement officer.

† Titled as director and president

Academic departments and institutes
LSE's research and teaching is organised into a network of independent academic departments established by the LSE Council, the school's governing body, on the advice of the academic board, the school's senior academic authority.  There are currently 27 academic departments or institutes.

 Department of Accounting
 Department of Anthropology
 Department of Economic History
 Department of Economics
 Department of Finance
 Department of Geography and Environment
 Department of Gender Studies
 Department of Health Policy
 Department of Government
 Department of International Development
 Department of International History
 Department of International Relations
 Department of Management
 Department of Mathematics
 Department of Media and Communications 
 Department of Methodology
 Department of Philosophy, Logic and Scientific Method 
 Department of Psychological and Behavioural Science
 Department of Social Policy
 Department of Sociology
 Department of Statistics
 European Institute 
 International Inequalities Institute
 Institute of Public Affairs 
 Language Centre
 LSE Law School
 Marshall Institute for Philanthropy and Social Entrepreneurship
 School of Public Policy

Finances
The LSE group has an endowment (as of 31 July 2016) of £119M and had a total income for 2015–16 (excluding donations and endowments) of £311M (£293M in 2014–15) with expenditure of £307M (2014–15 £302M). Key sources of income included £177M from tuition fees and education contacts (2014–15 £167M), £25M from funding council grants (2014–15 £22M), £32M from research grants (2014–15 – £27M) and £5.3M from investment income (2014–15 £4.7M).

The Times Higher Education Pay Survey 2017 revealed that, among larger, non-specialist institutions, LSE professors and academics were the highest paid in the UK, with average incomes of £103,886 and £65,177 respectively.

Endowment

The London School of Economics (LSE) is aiming to increase the size of its endowment fund to more than £1bn, which would make it one of the best resourced institutions in the UK and the world. The effort was initiated in 2016 by Lord Myners, then chairman of the LSE's Council and Court of Governors. The plan includes working with wealthy alumni of LSE to make large contributions, increasing the annual budget surplus, and launching a new, widescale alumni donor campaign. The plan to grow LSE's endowment to more than £1bn has been continued by Lord Myners' successors at the LSE. The LSE has stated that currently "limited endowment funding constrains our ability to offer 'needs blind' admission to students".

Academic year
LSE continues to adopt a three-term structure and has not moved to semesters. Michaelmas Term runs from October to mid-December, Lent Term from mid-January to late March and Summer Term from late April to mid-June.  Certain departments operate reading weeks in early November and mid-February.

Logo, arms and mascot

The school's historic coat of arms is used on official documentation including degree certificates and transcripts and includes the motto – rerum cognoscere causas, a line taken from Virgil's Georgics meaning "to know the causes of things", together with the school's mascot – a beaver. Both these symbols, adopted in February 1922, continue to be held in high regard to this day with the beaver chosen because of its representation as "a hard working and industrious yet sociable animal", attributes that the founders hoped LSE students to both possess and aspire to. The school's weekly newspaper is still entitled The Beaver, Rosebery residence hall's bar is called the Tipsy Beaver and LSE sports teams are known as the Beavers. The institution has two sets of colours – brand and academic – red being the brand colour used on signage, publications and in buildings across campus and purple, black and gold for academic purposes including presentation ceremonies and graduation dress.

LSE's present 'red block' logo was adopted as part of a rebrand in the early 2000s, before which the school's coat of arms was used exclusively to represent the institution. As a trademarked brand, it is carefully protected but can be produced in various forms to reflect different requirements.  In its full form it contains the full name of the institution to the right of the block with a further small empty red square at the end, but it is adapted for each academic department or professional service division to provide a cohesive brand across the institution.

Academic profile

Admissions 

The LSE received 20,000 applications for 1,600 undergraduate places in 2017, or 12.5 applicants per place. All undergraduate applications, including international applications, are made through UCAS. LSE had the 15th highest average entry qualification for undergraduates of any UK university in 2018–19, with new students averaging 168 UCAS points, equivalent to A*A*A* or ABBB in A-level grades. The university gave offers of admission to 37.0% of its applicants in 2015, the 3rd lowest amongst the Russell Group.

Postgraduate students at the LSE are required to have a first or upper second Class UK honours degree, or its foreign equivalent, for master's degrees, while direct entry to the MPhil/PhD programme requires a UK taught master's with merit, or foreign equivalent. Admission to the diploma requires a UK degree or equivalent plus relevant experience. The intake to applications ratio for postgraduate degree programmes is very competitive; the MSc Financial Mathematics had a ratio of just over 4% in 2016.

31.6% of LSE's undergraduates are privately educated, the ninth highest proportion amongst mainstream British universities. In the 2016–17 academic year, the university had a domicile breakdown of 33:18:50 of UK:EU:non-EU students respectively with a female-to-male ratio of 52:47.

Programmes and degrees 
LSE is the only university in the United Kingdom dedicated solely to the study and research of social sciences. LSE awards a range of academic degrees spanning bachelors, masters and PhDs. The post-nominals awarded are the degree abbreviations used commonly among British universities.

The school offers over 140 MSc programmes, 5 MPA programmes, an LLM, 30 BSc programmes, an LLB, 4 BA programmes (including International History and Geography), and 35 PhD programmes. Subjects pioneered in Britain by LSE include accountancy and sociology, and the school also employed Britain's first full-time lecturer in economic history. Courses are split across more than thirty research centres and nineteen departments, plus a Language Centre. Lastly, in partnership with the federal University of London, LSE oversees 9 BSc programmes as the lead institution which designs the curriculum. Students who chose to study online experience the same unique academic experience as on-campus, they are considered a part of LSE community and they have a variety of options to interact with their university, such as the LSE general course. Since programmes are all within the social sciences, they closely resemble each other, and undergraduate students usually take at least one course module in a subject outside of their degree for their first and second years of study, promoting a broader education in the social sciences. At undergraduate level, some departments have as few as 90 students across the three years of study. Since September 2010, it has been compulsory for first year undergraduates to participate in LSE 100: Understanding the Causes of Things alongside normal studies.

From 1902, following its absorption into the University of London, until 2007, all degrees were awarded by the federal university in common with all other colleges of the university. This system was changed in 2007 to enable some colleges to award their own degrees. LSE was granted the power to begin awarding its own degrees from July 2008. All students entering from the 2007–08 academic year onwards received an LSE degree, while students who started before this date were issued University of London degrees. In conjunction with NYU Stern and HEC Paris, LSE also offers the TRIUM Executive MBA. This was globally ranked third among executive MBAs by the Financial Times in 2016.

Research 
According to the 2021 Research Excellence Framework, LSE was rated joint third (along with Cambridge) in the UK for the quality (GPA) of its research and 33rd for its research power. In the 2014 Research Excellence Framework, LSE had the joint highest percentage of world-leading research among research submitted of any institution that entered more than one unit of assessment and was ranked third by cumulative grade point average with a score of 3.35, beating both Oxford and Cambridge. It was ranked 23rd in the country for research power by Research Fortnight based on its REF2014 results, and 28th in research power by the Times Higher Education. This followed the Research Assessment Exercise in 2008 where the school was placed second equal nationally on GPA, first for fraction of world-leading (4*) research and fourth for fraction of world-leading or internationally excellent (3* and 4*) research in LSE's analysis of the results, fourth equal for GPA and 29th for research power in Times Higher Education's analysis, and 27th in research power by Research Fortnight's analysis.

According to analysis of the REF 2014 subject results by Times Higher Education, the school is the UK's top research university in terms of GPA of research submitted in business and management; area studies; and communication, cultural and media studies, library and information management, and second in law; politics and international studies; economics and econometrics; and social work and social policy.

Research centres 
The school houses a number of notable centres including the Centre for the Analysis of Social Exclusion, the Centre for Climate Change Economics and Policy, the Centre for Macroeconomics, Centre for Economic Performance, LSE Health and Social Care, the Financial Markets Group (founded by former Bank of England governor Sir Mervyn King), the Grantham Research Institute on Climate Change and the Environment (chaired by Lord Stern), LSE Cities, the UK Department for International Development funded International Growth Centre and one of the six the UK government-backed 'What Works Centres' – the What Works Centre for Local Economic Growth.  The Greater London Group was influential research centre within LSE from the late 1950s on, before being subsumed into the LSE London research group.

LSE Institute of Global Affairs

In late 2014, LSE hired Erik Berglöf, former chief economist and special advisor to the EBRD to establish a new Institute of Global Affairs with seven regional research centres focusing on Africa, East Asia, Latin America and the Caribbean, the Middle East, South Asia, South East Asia and the United States.  It is joined by the LSE IDEAS think tank, which in a global survey conducted by the University of Pennsylvania in 2015 was jointly ranked as world's second-best university think tank for the third year running alongside the LSE Public Policy Group, after Harvard University's Belfer Center for Science and International Affairs.

In February 2015, Angelina Jolie and William Hague launched the UK's first academic Centre on Women, Peace and Security, based at the school. The centre aims to contribute to global women's rights issues, including the prosecution of war rape and women's engagement in politics, through academic research, a post-graduate teaching program, public engagement, and collaboration with international organisations. Furthermore, in May 2016 it was announced that Jolie-Pitt and Hague would join Jane Connors and Madeleine Rees as visiting professors in practice from September 2016.

Partnerships 
LSE has academic partnerships in teaching and research with six universities – with Columbia University in New York City and University of California, Berkeley, in Asia with Peking University in Beijing and the National University of Singapore, in Africa with the University of Cape Town and Europe with Sciences Po in Paris.

Together they offer a range of double or joint degree programmes including an MA in International and World History (with Columbia) and an MSc in international affairs with Peking University, with graduates earning degrees from both institutions. The school also offers joint degrees for specific departments with various other universities including Fudan University in Shanghai, USC in Los Angeles and a Global Studies programme which is offered with a consortium of four European universities – Leipzig, Vienna, Roskilde and Wroclaw.  It offers the TRIUM Global Executive MBA programme jointly with Stern School of Business of New York University and HEC School of Management, Paris. It is divided into six modules held in five international business locations over a 16-month period. LSE also offers a Dual Master of Public Administration (MPA) with Global Public Policy Network schools such as Sciences Po Paris, the Hertie School of Governance and National University of Singapore, and a duel MPA-Master of Global Affairs (MGA) degree with the University of Toronto's Munk School of Global Affairs.

The school also runs exchange programmes with a number of international business schools through the Global Master's in Management programme and an undergraduate student exchange programme with the University of California, Berkeley in Political Science. LSE is the only UK member school in the CEMS Alliance, and the LSE Global Master's in Management is the only programme in the UK to offer the CEMS Master's in International Management (CEMS MIM) as a double degree option, allowing students to study at one of 34 CEMS partner universities. It also participates in Key Action 1 of the European Union-wide Erasmus+ programme, encouraging staff and student mobility for teaching, although not the other Key Actions in the programme.

The school is a member of the Association of Commonwealth Universities, the European University Association, the G5, the Global Alliance in Management Education, the Russell Group and Universities UK, and is sometimes considered part of the 'Golden Triangle' of universities in south-east England, along with the University of Oxford, the University of Cambridge, University College London, Imperial College London, and King's College London.

LSE’s European Institute offers a Double Degree in European and International Public Policy and Politics with Bocconi University in Milan.

Libraries and archives 

LSE's main library, the British Library of Political and Economic Science, is located in the Lionel Robbins Building, which reopened in 2001 following a two-year renovation by Foster and Partners. Founded in 1896, it is the world's largest library dedicated to social sciences and the United Kingdom's national social sciences library. Its collections are recognised for their national and international significance and hold 'Designation' status by the Museums, Libraries and Archives Council (MLA). The library welcomes 1.8 million visits per year by students, staff, and the public and contains over 4 million print volumes, 60,000 online journals, and 29,000 electronic books. The Digital Library contains digitised material from LSE Library collections and also born-digital material that has been collected and preserved in digital formats.

The Women's Library, Britain's main library and archive on women and the women's movement, is located in a purpose-built facility with a reading room and exhibition space in the Lionel Robbins Building. The library relocated from London Metropolitan University in 2014.

The Shaw Library, housed in the Founders' Room in the Old Building, contains the school's collection of fiction and general readings. It functions as a general-purpose reading and common room and hosts lunchtime music concerts, press launches, and the Fabian Window, which was unveiled by Prime Minister Tony Blair in 2006.

Several subject-specific libraries exist at LSE, including the Seligman Library for Anthropology, the Himmelweit Library for Social Psychology, the Leverhulme Library for Statistics, the Robert McKenzie Library for Sociology, the Michael Wise Library for Geography, and the Gender Institute Library. Additionally, LSE staff and some students are permitted to access and borrow items from Senate House Library, the SOAS Library, and select institutions through the SCONUL Access scheme.

LSE Summer School 
The original LSE Summer School was established in 1989 and has since expanded to offer over 70 three-week courses in accounting, finance, economics, English language, international relations, government, law and management each July and August. It is advertised as the largest and one of the most well-established university Summer Schools of its kind in Europe.

In recent years, the school has expanded its summer schools both abroad and into executive education with the LSE-PKU Summer School in Beijing (run with Peking University), the LSE-UCT July School in Cape Town (run with the University of Cape Town) and the Executive Summer School at its London campus. In 2011, it also launched a Methods Summer Programme. Together these courses welcome over 5,000 participants from over 130 countries and some of the top colleges and universities around the world, as well as professionals from several multinational institutions. Participants are housed in LSE halls of residence or their overseas equivalents, and the Summer School provides a full social programme including guest lectures and receptions.

Public lectures 

Public lectures hosted by LSE Events office, are open to students, alumni and the general public. As well as leading academics and commentators, speakers frequently include prominent national and international figures such as ambassadors, CEOs, Members of Parliament, and heads of state. A number of these are broadcast live around the world via the school's website. LSE organises over 200 public events every year.

Recent prominent speakers have included Kofi Annan, Ben Bernanke, Tony Blair, Gordon Brown, David Cameron, Noam Chomsky, Bill Clinton, Philip Craven, Niall Ferguson, Vicente Fox, Milton Friedman, Muammar Gaddafi, Julia Gillard, Alan Greenspan, Tenzin Gyatso, Lee Hsien Loong, Boris Johnson, David Harvey, Jean Tirole, Angelina Jolie, Paul Krugman, Dmitri Medvedev, Mario Monti, George Osborne, Robert Peston, Sebastián Piñera, Kevin Rudd, Jeffrey Sachs, Gerhard Schroeder, Carlos D. Mesa, Luiz Inácio Lula da Silva, Aung San Suu Kyi, Amartya Sen, George Soros and Rowan Williams. Previously, the school has hosted figures including Nelson Mandela and Margaret Thatcher.

There are also a number of annual lecture series hosted by various departments. These include but are not limited to the Malinowski Memorial Lectures hosted by the department of anthropology, the Lionel Robbins Memorial Lectures and the Ralph Miliband programme.

Publishing

In 2018, the university launched LSE Press in partnership with Ubiquity Press. This is intended to publish open-access journals and books in the social sciences. The first journal to be published by the press was the Journal of Illicit Economies and Development, edited by John Collins, executive director of LSE's International Drug Policy Unit. The press is managed through the LSE Library.

Rankings and reputation 

LSE is ranked third in the UK in the Complete University Guide 2022, fifth in the Times/Sunday Times Good University Guide 2022, and fifth in The Guardian University Guide 2021.

The QS World University Rankings for 2023 rankings saw the LSE placed 56th among the world's universities. The 2023 Times Higher Education World University Rankings ranked LSE 37th globally. On the other hand, Academic Ranking of World Universities for 2022 ranked LSE in the 151–200 range. While the 2022 U.S. News & World Report Best Global Universities 2022 ranked LSE's social science and economics programs highly, overall, it ranked LSE 230th globally.

In terms of specific subject areas, the QS World University Rankings by Subject 2020 ranks the LSE second in the world in economics & social sciences and management and 20th for arts and humanities, while for individual subjects it is ranked second for geography, third for communication and media studies, social policy and administration, and sociology, in the top ten for accounting and finance, anthropology, business and management studies, development studies, economics and econometrics, history, law and legal studies, philosophy, and politics, and in the top 50 for psychology, and statistics and operational research. Times Higher Education's subject rankings for 2021 place LSE 7th for business and economics, 8th for social sciences, 10th for law, 17th equal for psychology, 21st for arts and humanities, and in the 251–300 range for physical sciences. U.S. News & World Report ranked LSE 7th globally for economics, 34th for social sciences, 57th for arts and humanities, 141st equal for psychiatry/psychology, and 212th equal for public, environmental and occupational health.

According to data released by the Department for Education in 2018, LSE was rated as the best university for boosting graduate earnings, with male graduates seeing a 47.2% increase in earnings and female graduates seeing a 38.2% increase in earnings compared to the average graduate.

According to Wealth-X and UBS's "Billionaire Census" in 2014, LSE ranked 10th in the list of 20 schools that have produced the most billionaire alumni. The LSE was the only UK university to make the list.

In the 2020 National Student Survey LSE came 64th out of 154 for overall student satisfaction. The LSE had scored well below its benchmark on this measure in previous years, coming 145th out of 148 in 2017. The increase in student satisfaction in 2020 led to a climb of 14 places to fifth in the 2021 Guardian ranking.

Student life

Student body 
In the 2015–16 academic year there were 10,833 full-time students and around 700 part-time students at the university. Of these, approximately 7,500 came from outside the United Kingdom (approximately 70% of the total student body), making LSE a highly international school with over 160 countries represented. LSE had more countries represented by students than the UN. 32% of LSE's students come from Asia, 10% from North America, 2% each from South America and Africa. Combined over 100 languages are spoken at LSE. Over half of LSE's students are postgraduates, and there is approximately an equal split between genders with 51% male and 49% female students. Alumni total over 160,000, covering over 190 countries with more than 80 active alumni groups.

Students' Union 

The LSE Students' Union (LSESU) is affiliated to the National Union of Students and is responsible for campaigning and lobbying the school on behalf of students as well providing student support and the organisation and undertaking of entertainment events and student societies. It is often regarded as the most politically active in Britain – a reputation it has held since the well documented LSE student riots in 1966–67 and 1968–69, which made international headlines. In 2015, the school was awarded the top spot for student nightlife by The Guardian newspaper due in part to its central location and provision of over 200 societies, 40 sports clubs, a Raising and Giving (RAG) branch and a thriving media group. In 2013, the union moved into a purpose-built new building – the Saw Swee Hock Student Centre on the Aldwych campus.

A weekly student newspaper The Beaver, is published each Tuesday during term time and is amongst the oldest student newspapers in the country. It sits alongside a radio station, Pulse! which has existed since 1999 and a television station LooSE Television since 2005. The Clare Market Review one of Britain's oldest student publications was revived in 2008.  Over £150,000 is raised for charity each year through the RAG (Raising and Giving), the fundraising arm of the Students' Union, which was started in 1980 by then Student Union Entertainments Officer and former New Zealand MP Tim Barnett.

Sporting activity is coordinated by the LSE Athletics Union, which is a constituent of British Universities & Colleges Sport (BUCS).

Student housing 

LSE owns or operates 10 halls of residence in and around central London and there are also two halls owned by urbanest and five intercollegiate halls (shared with other constituent colleges of the University of London) within a 3-mile radius of the school, for a total of over 4,000 places. Most residences take both undergraduates and postgraduates, although Carr-Saunders Hall and Passfield Hall are undergraduate only, and Butler's Wharf Residence, Grosvenor House and Lillian Knowles House are reserved for postgraduates. Sidney Webb House, managed by Unite Students, takes postgraduates and continuing students. There are also flats available on Anson and Carleton roads, which are reserved for students with children.

The school guarantees accommodation for all first-year undergraduate students and many of the school's larger postgraduate population are also catered for, with some specific residences available for postgraduate living. Whilst none of the residences are located at the Aldwych campus, the closest, Grosvenor House is within a five-minute walk from the school in Covent Garden, whilst the farthest residences (Nutford and Butler's Wharf) are approximately forty-five minutes by Tube or Bus.

Each residence accommodates a mixture of students both home and international, male and female, and, usually, undergraduate and postgraduate. New undergraduate students (including General Course students) occupy approximately 55% of all spaces, with postgraduates taking approximately 40% and continuing students about 5% of places.

The largest LSE student residence, Bankside House, a refurbished early 1950s office block and former headquarters of the Central Electricity Generating Board, opened to students in 1996 and is fully catered, accommodating 617 students across eight floors overlooking the River Thames. It is located behind the Tate Modern art gallery on the south bank of the river. The second-largest residence, the High Holborn Residence in High Holborn, was opened in 1995 and is approximately 10 minutes walk from the main campus. It is self-catering, accommodating 447 students in flats of four our five bedrooms with shared facilities.

Notable people 

LSE has a long list of notable alumni and staff, spanning the fields of scholarship provided by the school. The school has over 50 fellows of the British Academy on its staff, while other notable former staff members include Brian Barry, Maurice Cranston, Anthony Giddens, Harold Laski, Ralph Miliband, Michael Oakeshott, A. W. Philips, Karl Popper, Lionel Robbins, Susan Strange, Bob Ward and Charles Webster. Mervyn King, the former Governor of the Bank of England, is also a former professor of economics.

Of the current 9 members of the Bank of England Monetary Policy Committee the following 5 have affiliation to the LSE: Jonathan Haskel (alumni), Michael Saunders (alumni), Gertjan Vlieghe (alumni), Silvana Tenereyro (current professor of economics) and Governor Andrew Bailey (former Research Officer).

In the political arena notable alumni and staff include 53 past or present heads of state, 20 members of the current British House of Commons and 46 members of the current House of Lords. Former British Prime Minister Clement Attlee taught at the school from 1912 to 1923. In recent British politics, former LSE students include Virginia Bottomley, Yvette Cooper, Edwina Currie, Frank Dobson, Margaret Hodge, Robert Kilroy-Silk, former UK Labour Party leader Ed Miliband and former UK Liberal Democrats leader Jo Swinson. Internationally, the current and first female president of the European Commission Ursula von der Leyen, Brazilian defence minister Celso Amorim, Costa Rican President Óscar Arias, former Japanese Prime Minister Taro Aso, Queen Margrethe II of Denmark, architect of the Indian Constitution and eminent economist B. R. Ambedkar, President of India K. R. Narayanan, President of the Republic of China (Taiwan) Tsai Ing-wen, Italian prime minister and president of the European Commission, Romano Prodi, French Foreign Minister and president of the Constitutional Council Roland Dumas as well as Singapore's deputy prime minister and chairman of the International Monetary and Financial Committee at the International Monetary Fund (IMF), Tharman Shanmugaratnam all studied at LSE. A notable number of LSE students have also played a role in the Barack Obama administration, including Pete Rouse, Peter R. Orszag, Mona Sutphen, Paul Volcker and Jason Furman. Physician Vanessa Kerry and American journalist Susan Rasky are also alumnae of the LSE. Notable American Monica Lewinsky pursued her MSc in Social Psychology at the LSE.

Business people who studied at LSE include the CEO of AirAsia Tony Fernandes,  former CEO of General Motors Daniel Akerson, director of Louis Vuitton Delphine Arnault, founder of easyJet Stelios Haji-Ioannou, CEO of Abercrombie & Fitch Michael S. Jeffries, Greek business magnate Spiros Latsis, American banker David Rockefeller, CEO of Newsmax Media Christopher Ruddy, founder of advertising agency Saatchi and Saatchi Maurice Saatchi, hedge fund managers George Soros and Michael Platt and Andreas Utermann, former CEO of Allianz Global Investors.

A survey by employment specialists Emolument.com found that it on average took LSE graduates 11.6 years in the workforce to begin earning base salaries in excess of £500,000; the shortest timespan of any university in the United Kingdom.

Convicted British terrorist, Omar Saeed Sheikh, studied statistics at LSE, but did not graduate. He served five years in an Indian prison for kidnapping British tourists in 1994. In 2002, he was arrested and convicted in the kidnapping and murder of Daniel Pearl. The Guardian reported that Sheikh came into contact with radical Islamists at the LSE.

Nobel laureates 

As of 2019, 18 Nobel Prizes in economics, peace and literature are officially recognised as having been awarded to LSE alumni and staff.

LSE in literature and other media 

The LSE has been mentioned and formed the basis of setting for numerous works of fiction and in popular culture.

The first notable mention of the LSE was in literature was in the epilogue to Bernard Shaw's 1912 play ''Pygmalion', Eliza Dolittle is sent to the LSE.

In around a dozen other novels, the LSE was mentioned as short-hand for a character being witty and clever but outside the establishment. This is best exhibited by Ian Fleming's CV of James Bond that included the detail that his father, Andrew, is an LSE graduate. These occurrences have continued into contemporary fiction: Lenny is the young 'hip' LSE graduate and criminologist in Jake Arnott's tour of the London underworld in The Long Firm. Robert Harris' Enigma includes Baxter, a code breaker with leftist views, who has been an LSE lecturer before the war and My Revolutions by Hari Kunzru traces the career of Chris Carver aka Michael Frame who travels from LSE student radical to terrorist and on to middle England.

Former LSE alumnus Hilary Mantel in The Experience of Love never mentions LSE by name but Houghton Street, the corridors of the LSE Old Building and Wright's Bar are immediately recognisable references to the campus of the school. A.S. Byatt's The Children's Book returns to LSE's Fabian roots with a plot inspired in part by the life of children's writer E. Nesbitt and Fabian Hubert Bland, and characters that choose LSE over older educational establishments (namely Oxford and Cambridge).

On the small screen, the popular 1980s British sitcom Yes Minister and Yes Prime Minister make a regular references to the LSE with Minister Jim Hacker (later Prime Minister) and Sir Mark Spencer (special advisor to the Prime Minister) regularly being subtly ridiculed for having attended the LSE.  A slightly earlier fictional LSE graduate appears in season three episode six of the US series, Mad Men. The popular American series The West Wing following the Democratic administration of Josiah (Jed) Barltet makes several references to Josiah Bartlet being an alumnus of the LSE. Other fictional LSE alumnus are present in Spooks, at least one episode of The Professionals and The Blacklist series.

In movies and motion pictures, in the 2014 action spy thriller Shadow Recruit, the young Jack Ryan, based on a Tom Clancy character, proves his academic credentials by walking out of the Old Building as he graduates from the London School of Economics before injuring his spine being shot down in Afghanistan. The LSE is acknowledged in The Social Network naming the institution along with Oxford and Cambridge Universities in a reference to the rapid growth Facebook enjoyed both within and outside the United States in its early years.

See also
 Armorial of UK universities
 List of universities in the UK

Notes

References

Further reading
 
 "Determined Challengers Keep Heat on the Elite", The Times Higher Education Supplement, 28 October 2005
 "1969: LSE closes over student clashes", BBC News
 "IDEAS Research Assessment UK top 20% of Departments & World top 5% of Departments", "IDEAS, University of Connecticut, Top 20% UK institutions"

External links 

 
 Catalogue of the archives of LSE
 Memorandum about the school by William Beveridge, 1935
 Catalogue of School minute books, 1894–

 
University of London
Education in the City of Westminster
Russell Group
Educational institutions established in 1895
1895 establishments in England
1895 in economics
Political science in the United Kingdom
Universities UK